is a Japanese politician of the Liberal Democratic Party, a member of the House of Representatives in the Diet (national legislature). A native of Kaminoyama, Yamagata and graduate of Chuo University (where he played Rugby), he was elected to the assembly of Yamagata Prefecture in 1983, serving there for one term. In 1993 he was elected to the House of Representatives for the first time as an independent after an unsuccessful run in 1990. He headed an overhaul of Japan's English language education. In 2015 he was appointed to oversee the 2020 Summer Olympics preparations on behalf of the Japanese government.

Donation scandal
In February 2016 it emerged that he had received ¥9.5 million over five years in donations from the head of an unnamed Tokyo-based teacher dispatch company as the company was trying to boost the use of Assistant Language Teachers (ALTs) across Japan. It was alleged that due to the donations Endo lobbied for greater use of ALTs and supported a project the company was pushing. Staff of the company spoke about how they appreciated Endo's efforts. Endo admitted the donations and expanding the use of ALTs but claimed that he had done nothing wrong. Prime Minister Abe defended Endo and said "“My administration would never let cash affect its policies”.

References

External links 
 Official website in Japanese.

Members of the House of Representatives (Japan)
Chuo University alumni
Living people
1950 births
Liberal Democratic Party (Japan) politicians
People from Yamagata Prefecture
21st-century Japanese politicians